Gokul is a town in the Mathura district of the Indian state of Uttar Pradesh. According to Bhagavata Purana, Krishna spent his childhood in Gokul.

Geography

Demographics
According to the 2001 census of India, Gokul had a population of 4041. Males constituted 55% of the population and females 45%. The average literacy rate was 60%, higher than the national average of 59.5%: male literacy was 68%, and female literacy was 49%. 18% of the population was under 8 years of age.

Places of interest

Baithakji of Mahaprabhu shrimad Vallabhacharya
Shri Vallabhacharya Mahaprabhu was the one who rediscovered Gokul and places where Purushottam Shri Krishna did his leela. He did Shrimad Bhagwat parayana there in two places called Baithakji.
1. Govindghat
2. Badi bhitar baithak

Raja Thakur temple
It is a prominent temple of Vallabh sampraday Pushtimarg. It is considered as home to Shri Gusaiji and the place where the self-manifested deity shri navnitlal[a form of krishna] lived. It is divine place.

References

Cities and towns in Mathura district
Krishna